The 1942 Taça de Portugal Final was the final match of the 1941–42 Taça de Portugal, the 4th season of the Taça de Portugal, the premier Portuguese football cup competition organized by the Portuguese Football Federation (FPF). The match was played on 12 July 1942 at the Estádio do Lumiar in Lisbon, and opposed two Primeira Liga sides: Belenenses and Vitória de Guimarães. Belenenses defeated Vitória de Guimarães 2–0 to claim their first Taça de Portugal.

Match

Details

References

1942
Taca
C.F. Os Belenenses matches
Vitória S.C. matches